The 2019 Yas Island Formula 2 round was a pair of motor races held on 30 November and 1 December 2019 at the Yas Marina Circuit in Abu Dhabi, United Arab Emirates as part of the FIA Formula 2 Championship. It was the twelfth and final race of the 2019 FIA Formula 2 Championship and was run in support of the 2019 Abu Dhabi Grand Prix.

Classifications

Qualifying

Feature Race

Sprint Race

Final championship standings

Drivers' Championship standings

Teams' Championship standings

References

Yas Island
Yas Island